Yuma is an unincorporated community in Taylor County, Kentucky, United States.  It lies along Route 76 southeast of the city of Campbellsville, the county seat of Taylor County.  Its elevation is 722 feet (220 m).

References

Unincorporated communities in Taylor County, Kentucky
Unincorporated communities in Kentucky